Sima Hui (died 208), courtesy name Decao and pseudonym Shuijing, was a hermit who lived during the late Eastern Han dynasty of China.

Life
Sima Hui was from Yangzhai County, Yingchuan Commandery, which is around present-day Yuzhou, Henan. He lived in northern Jing Province (荊州), which covered present-day Hubei and Hunan. He is popularly remembered as the one who recommended Zhuge Liang and Pang Tong to the warlord Liu Bei in the 14th-century historical novel Romance of the Three Kingdoms, even though historically it was his friend Pang Degong (龐德公; Pang Tong's uncle) who did so. Sima Hui served as an official

Sima Hui was known to never mention others' shortcomings or flaws. His reply to both good and bad news would always be "hao" (好; literally "good" or "yes"). When someone asked him, "How are you?", he replied, "Good." When somebody told him that their son had died, he said, "Very good." His wife chided him for that, saying, "Everyone sees you as a person of good moral conduct so they are willing to share their problems with you. Why do you say 'very good' when someone tells you that his son had died?" Sima Hui replied, "It's also good to hear what you've just said." This gave rise to the Chinese idiom haohao xiansheng (好好先生; literally "Mr. Yes" or "Mr. Good").

The warlord Cao Cao attempted to recruit Sima Hui after taking control of Jing Province in 208. However, Sima Hui died before Cao Cao could make any significant use of the hermit's talents.

In Romance of the Three Kingdoms
In Chapter 37 of the 14th-century historical novel Romance of the Three Kingdoms, Sima Hui is described to be a carefree, wandering man who is well-versed in many arts. He has a close relationship with Pang Tong, and refers to Pang Tong as a younger brother.

Sima Hui is also featured in Chan Mou's manhua The Ravages of Time as the teacher of the "Eight Enigmas", a group of elite strategists and advisers.

In popular culture
Sima Hui is portrayed by Wang Shijun in the 2010 Chinese television series Three Kingdoms.

See also
 Lists of people of the Three Kingdoms

References

 Chen, Shou (3rd century). Records of the Three Kingdoms (Sanguozhi).
 Luo, Guanzhong (14th century). Romance of the Three Kingdoms (Sanguo Yanyi).
 Pei, Songzhi (5th century). Annotations to Records of the Three Kingdoms (Sanguozhi zhu).

Year of birth unknown
Year of death unknown
People during the end of the Han dynasty
People from Xuchang